"Make Me a Miracle" is a popular song. It was written by Al Hoffman, Dick Manning, and Hugo Peretti and Luigi Creatore and published in 1958.

The best-known recording of the song was done by Jimmie Rodgers, charting in 1958.

1958 songs
Songs written by Al Hoffman
Songs written by Dick Manning
Songs written by Hugo Peretti
Songs written by Luigi Creatore
Jimmie Rodgers (pop singer) songs